Wolfsbrunn may refer to:

 Wolfsbrunn (Hollabrunn), village and cadastral municipality in Lower Austria
 Wolfsbrunn Castle (Burg or Schloss Wolfsbrunn), both abandoned, in Wolfsbrunn (Hollabrunn)
 Schloss Wolfsbrunn, formerly a grand villa, now a hotel, in Hartenstein, Saxony
 Wolfsbrunnen (Heidelberg), Brunnen, Germany
 Wolfsbrunnen Castle, Hesse, Germany